A penumbral lunar eclipse took place on Tuesday, May 15, 1984, the first of three lunar eclipses in 1984. This was a deep penumbral eclipse, with the southern limb of the Moon close to the Earth's shadow.

This was the first eclipse of 1984 (first of three penumbral lunar eclipses). The second occurred on June 13th, and the third occurred on November 8th.

Visibility

Related eclipses

Eclipses of 1984 
 A penumbral lunar eclipse on May 15.
 An annular solar eclipse on May 30.
 A penumbral lunar eclipse on June 13.
 A penumbral lunar eclipse on November 8.
 A total solar eclipse on November 22.

Lunar year series

Saros series 

Lunar Saros 111, repeating every 18 years and 11 days, has a total of 71 lunar eclipse events including 11 total lunar eclipses. The first total lunar eclipse of this series was on April 19, 1353, and last was on August 4, 1533. The longest occurrence of this series was on June 12, 1443 when the totality lasted 106 minutes.

Metonic series 

This eclipse is the first of four Metonic cycle lunar eclipses on the same date, May 15–16, each separated by 19 years.

Half-Saros cycle
A lunar eclipse will be preceded and followed by solar eclipses by 9 years and 5.5 days (a half saros). This lunar eclipse is related to two partial solar eclipses of Solar Saros 118.

See also 
List of lunar eclipses
List of 20th-century lunar eclipses

Notes

External links 
 

1984-05
1984 in science
May 1984 events